Dibaeis is a genus of lichen-forming fungi in the family Icmadophilaceae. The genus is widely distributed in tropical regions. Dibaeis was circumscribed in 1909 by Frederic Edward Clements with Dibaeis rosea as the type species. Several species were transferred from other genera in a 1993 publication.

Species
Dibaeis absoluta 
Dibaeis arcuata 
Dibaeis birmensis 
Dibaeis columbiana 
Dibaeis cretacea 
Dibaeis fungoides 
Dibaeis globulifera 
Dibaeis holstii 
Dibaeis inaequalis 
Dibaeis inundata 
Dibaeis pulogensis 
Dibaeis rosea 
Dibaeis sorediata 
Dibaeis stipitata 
Dibaeis umbrelliformis 
Dibaeis weberi 
Dibaeis yurii

References

Pertusariales
Pertusariales genera
Lichen genera
Taxa described in 1909
Taxa named by Frederic Clements